Boguchany may refer to:
Boguchany (rural locality), a rural locality (selo) in Krasnoyarsk Krai, Russia
Boguchany Airport, an airport near that village
Boguchany hydroelectric power station